List table of the properties and districts — listed on the California Historical Landmarks — within Placer County, California. 

Note: Click the "Map of all coordinates" link to the right to view a Google map of all properties and districts with latitude and longitude coordinates in the table below.

Listings

|}

References

See also

List of California Historical Landmarks
National Register of Historic Places listings in Placer County, California

  
 

. 
List of California Historical Landmarks
H01
Protected areas of Placer County, California
California Gold Rush
Placer County, California
History of the San Joaquin Valley
History of the Sierra Nevada (United States)